The Filmfare Best Screenplay Award is given by the Filmfare magazine as part of its annual Filmfare Awards for Hindi films.

Superlatives

Most Awards
Salim–Javed – 3
Basu Chatterjee – 3
Rajkumar Hirani – 3
Mani Ratnam – 2
Vijay Tendulkar – 2
Vidhu Vinod Chopra – 2
Abhijat Joshi – 2

Note: Both Vidhu Vinod Chopra and Rajkumar Hirani won the award twice jointly.

List of winners

1960s
 1969 Nabendu Ghosh – Majhli Didi

1970s
 1970 Hrishikesh Mukherjee – Anokhi Raat
 1971 Vijay Anand – Johny Mera Naam
 1972 Basu Chatterjee – Sara Akash
 1973 Arvind Mukherjee – Amar Prem
 1974 Salim–Javed – Zanjeer
 1975 Shama Zaidi, Kaifi Azmi – Garm Hava
 1976 Salim–Javed – Deewaar
 1977 Basu Chatterjee – Chhoti Si Baat
 1978 Lekh Tandon, Vrajendra Kaur, Madhusudan Kalekar – Dulhan Wahi Jo Piya Man Bhaye
 1979 Kamleshwar – Pati Patni Aur Woh

1980s
 1980 Girish Karnad, B.V. Karanth – Godhuli
 1981 Vijay Tendulkar – Aakrosh
 1982 K. Balachander – Ek Duuje Ke Liye
 1983 Salim–Javed – Shakti
 1984 Vijay Tendulkar – Ardh Satya
 1985 Mrinal Sen – Khandhar
 1986 Goutam Ghose, Partha Banerjee – Paar
 1987 Not Awarded
 1988 Not Awarded
 1989 Nasir Hussain – Qayamat Se Qayamat Tak

1990s
 1990 Shiv Kumar Subramaniam – Parinda
 1991 Basu Chatterjee – Kamla Ki Maut
 1992 Tapan Sinha – Ek Doctor Ki Maut
 1993 Aziz Mirza, Manoj Lalwani – Raju Ban Gaya Gentleman
 1994 Robin Bhatt, Javed Siddiqui, Akash Khurana – Baazigar
 1995 Sooraj R. Barjatya – Hum Aapke Hain Koun..!
 1996 Aditya Chopra – Dilwale Dulhania Le Jayenge
 1997 Rajkumar Santoshi – Ghatak: Lethal
 1998 Subhash Ghai – Pardes
 1999 Karan Johar – Kuch Kuch Hota Hai

2000s
 2000 John Matthew Matthan – Sarfarosh
 2001 Honey Irani, Ravi Kapoor – Kaho Naa... Pyaar Hai
 2002 Farhan Akhtar – Dil Chahta Hai
 2003 Mani Ratnam – Saathiya
 2004 Rajkumar Hirani, Vidhu Vinod Chopra, Lajan Joseph – Munna Bhai M.B.B.S.
 2005 Mani Ratnam – Yuva
 2006 Nina Arora, Manoj Tyagi – Page 3
 2007 Jaideep Sahni – Khosla Ka Ghosla
 2008 Anurag Basu – Life In A... Metro
 2009 Yogendra Vinayak Joshi, Upendra Sidhaye – Mumbai Meri Jaan

2010s
 2010 Rajkumar Hirani, Vidhu Vinod Chopra, Abhijat Joshi – 3 Idiots
 2011 Anurag Kashyap, Vikramaditya Motwane – Udaan
 2012 Akshat Verma – Delhi Belly
 2013 Sanjay Chauhan and Tigmanshu Dhulia – Paan Singh Tomar
 2014 Chetan Bhagat, Abhishek Kapoor, Supratik Sen & Pubali Chaudhari – Kai Po Che!
 2015 Rajkumar Hirani, Abhijat Joshi – PK
 2016 Juhi Chaturvedi – Piku
 2017 Shakun Batra, Ayesha Devitre - Kapoor & Sons
 2018 Shubhashish Bhutiani - Mukti Bhawan
 2019 Sriram Raghavan, Arijit Biswas, Pooja Ladha Surti, Yogesh Chandekar, Hemanth Rao – Andhadhun
 Anubhav Sinha – Mulk
 Bhavani Iyer and Meghna Gulzar – Raazi
 Nandita Das – Manto
 Raj and DK – Stree

2020s
2020 Zoya Akhtar, Reema Kagti  - Gully Boy
 Anubhav Sinha, Gaurav Solanki - Article 15
 Balwinder Singh Janjua - Saand Ki Aankh
 Jagan Shakti, R Balki, Dharma, Nidhi Singh, Saket Kodiparthi - Mission Mangal
Manish Gupta, Ajay Bahl - Section 375
 Sudip Sharma - Sonchiriya
2021 Rohena Gera - Sir
Anubhav Sinha, Mrunmayee Lagoo Waikul - Thappad
Anurag Basu - Ludo
Kapil Sawant, Rajesh Krishnan -Lootcase
Prakash Kapadia, Om Raut -Tanhaji

References

Screenplay
Screenwriting awards for film